Harry Howard Cloudman (October 22, 1877 – December 11, 1950) was an American physician, track and field athlete, and coach of American football. He served as the head football coach at Bowdoin College in 1901 and the University of Vermont from 1902 to 1904.

Cloudman ran track at Bowdoin before graduating in 1901.  He set a Maine state record for the 100-yard dash in 1899 at an intercollegiate meet in Waterville.  Cloudman earned a medical degree from the University of Vermont College of Medicine—now known as the Robert Larner College of Medicine—in 1905.  He died on December 11, 1950, in Portland, Maine.

References

External links
 

1877 births
1950 deaths
20th-century American physicians
American male sprinters
Bowdoin Polar Bears football players
Bowdoin Polar Bears football coaches
Vermont Catamounts football coaches
College men's track and field athletes in the United States
College track and field coaches in the United States
High school football coaches in Oklahoma
University of Vermont alumni
People from Gorham, Maine
Physicians from Oklahoma
Coaches of American football from Maine